The Meitei folktales, also sometimes referred to as the Manipuri folktales, are the large collections of folk stories developed from the Meitei culture since Ancient Kangleipak (early Manipur).  Folktales are called "funga wari" ("phunga wari"), literally meaning "stories of kitchen furnace or stove" in Meitei language (officially called Manipuri language). In early times, in the Meitei households, children must have gathered around the kitchen fire, listening to the stories narrated by the elders. Generally, Meitei folktales were developed from the creativity of the old folks, especially the grandparents, who narrated the children the diverse sagas of varying genres.

List

Stories from Fungawari Singbul 
There are numerous folk stories, mainly fables, from Meitei folklore, compiled by B. Jayantakumar Sharma in the book "Fungawari Singbul".
Here is a list of the folk stories from the book:

Stories from the Funga Wari (Naharol Khorjei Thaugallup Jaribon) 
This is a list of the stories from the "Funga Wari" (literally, "folktales"), a book on Meitei folklore, published by the "Naharol Khorjei Thaugallup Jaribon".

Works

New Folktales of Manipur 
"New Folktales of Manipur" is a book, written by James Oinam. This collection documents Meitei mythology as well as Meitei beliefs and some of the many oral versions of Meitei folklore which the author had heard during his childhood.

The Tales of Kanglei Throne

And That Is Why... Manipuri Myths Retold

See also 
 Meitei folklore

Bibliography 

 https://books.google.co.in/books?id=TpM8DAAAQBAJ&pg=PT4&source=gbs_selected_pages&cad=3#v=onepage&q&f=false
 https://books.google.co.in/books?id=TpM8DAAAQBAJ&pg=PT11&source=gbs_selected_pages&cad=3#v=onepage&q&f=false

References

External links 

 

Meitei culture
Meitei folklore
Pages with unreviewed translations